Tattlersville is a community in Clarke County, Alabama, United States, located at .

References

Unincorporated communities in Alabama
Geography of Clarke County, Alabama